The 1999–2000 Cypriot Third Division was the 29th season of the Cypriot third-level football league. THOI Lakatamia won their 2nd title.

Format
Fourteen teams participated in the 1999–2000 Cypriot Third Division. All teams played against each other twice, once at their home and once away. The team with the most points at the end of the season crowned champions. The first three teams were promoted to the 1999–2000 Cypriot Second Division and the last three teams were relegated to the 1999–2000 Cypriot Fourth Division.

However, in the summer, after the end of the championship, Evagoras Paphos merged with APOP Paphos to form AEP Paphos (AEP took the place of APOP in the 2000–01 Cypriot First Division. Because of this, playoffs between the bottom three teams of the 1999–2000 Cypriot Second Division and the fourth team of the 1999–2000 Cypriot Third Division were held for the extra place in the 2000–01 Cypriot Second Division. Also, playoffs between the bottom 3 teams of the 1999–2000 Cypriot Third Division and the fourth team of the 1999–2000 Cypriot Fourth Division were held for the extra place in the 2000–01 Cypriot Third Division.

Point system
Teams received three points for a win, one point for a draw and zero points for a loss.

Changes from previous season
Teams promoted to 1999–2000 Cypriot Second Division
 Chalkanoras Idaliou
 Iraklis Gerolakkou
 APEP Pitsilia

Teams relegated from 1998–99 Cypriot Second Division
 Rotsidis Mammari
 ASIL Lysi 
 Akritas Chlorakas

Teams promoted from 1998–99 Cypriot Fourth Division
 ENTHOI Lakatamia
 Kinyras Empas
 Ellinismos Akakiou

Teams relegated to 1999–2000 Cypriot Fourth Division
 APEP Pelendriou
 ATE PEK Ergaton
 Elia Lythrodonta

League standings

Results

Relegation playoff
Standings

Results

See also
 Cypriot Third Division
 1999–2000 Cypriot First Division
 1999–2000 Cypriot Cup

Sources

Cypriot Third Division seasons
Cyprus
1999–2000 in Cypriot football